Glanville or Glanvill may refer to:

People

Given name
Glanville Downey (1908—1991), American historian
Glanville Williams (1911–1997), Welsh legal scholar

Surname
Ann Glanville (1796–1880), Cornish rower
Brandi Glanville (born 1972), American television personality and former fashion model
Brian Glanville (born 1931), English football writer and novelist
Christine Glanville (1924–1999), English puppeteer
Doug Glanville (born 1970), American baseball player
Eleanor Glanville (c. 1654–1709), English entomologist
Ernest Glanville (1855–1925), South African author
Francis Glanville (1827–1910), British Army general
Harold Glanville (1854–1930), English businessman and politician
Harold Glanville (junior) (1884–1966), English Liberal Party politician.
Jacob Glanville, co-founder of Distributed Bio
James Glanville (1891–1958), British politician
Jason Glanville, leader in Australian Indigenous community
Jerry Glanville (born 1941), American football coach
Sir John Glanville (judge) (1542–1600), English Member of Parliament and judge
Sir John Glanville (1586–1661), English politician
Joseph Glanvill (1636–1680), English writer
Lucy Glanville (born 1994), Australian biathlete
Marc Glanville (born 1966), Australian rugby league footballer
Mark Glanville, English classical singer and writer
Peggy Glanville-Hicks (1912–1990), Australian composer
Phil de Glanville (born 1968), English rugby union player
Ranulf de Glanvill (died 1190), English justiciar
Ranulph Glanville (born 1946), English researcher
Stephen Glanville (1900–1956), English Egyptologist
Sir William Glanville (1900–1976), British civil engineer

Places
Glanville, Calvados, commune in the Basse-Normandie region of France
Glanville, South Australia, suburb of Adelaide, Australia
Glanville railway station

Other uses
Tractatus de legibus et consuetudinibus regni Anglie, the earliest English law treatise (1187–9), commonly called Glanvill after its attribution to Ranulf de Glanvill
Glanville fritillary, butterfly

See also
Glanvilles, a village in Antigua and Barbuda
Glanvilles Wootton, also known as Wootton Glanville, a place in Dorset, England